Isabel le Despenser may refer to:

Isabel le Despenser, Countess of Arundel (1312–1356), daughter of Hugh Despenser the Younger and Eleanor de Clare
Isabel le Despenser, Countess of Worcester and Warwick (1400–1439), daughter of Thomas le Despenser, 1st Earl of Gloucester and Constance of York